Thomas Johns Perry (February 17, 1807 – June 27, 1871) was an American politician.

Born in Cumberland, Maryland, Perry completed preparatory studies and also studied law.  He was admitted to the bar in 1828 and commenced practice in Cumberland soon thereafter.  He served as a member of the Maryland House of Delegates from 1834 to 1836 and was elected as a Democrat to the Twenty-ninth United States Congress, serving from March 4, 1845, to March 3, 1847.  He was not a candidate for renomination in 1846.

After Congress, Perry served as associate judge of the sixth judicial district of Maryland from 1851 to 1861 and again from 1864 to 1871.  He was also a delegate to the State constitutional convention in 1867.  He died in Cumberland at the age of 64, and is interred in Rose Hill Cemetery.

References

1807 births
1871 deaths
Democratic Party members of the Maryland House of Delegates
Maryland state court judges
Lawyers from Cumberland, Maryland
Burials at Rose Hill Cemetery (Cumberland, Maryland)
Democratic Party members of the United States House of Representatives from Maryland
19th-century American politicians
19th-century American judges
Politicians from Cumberland, Maryland